The North Carolina judicial elections of 1998 were held on 3 November 1998, to elect judges to the North Carolina Supreme Court and North Carolina Court of Appeals.

Supreme Court

Webb seat

Whichard seat

Court of Appeals

Eagles seat

Greene seat

Horton seat

Timmons-Goodson seat

Arnold seat

Footnotes

Judicial
1998